Oberon High School is a secondary school located in Armstrong Creek, Geelong, Victoria, Australia (Melway Ref Map 465 G2).  Established in 1963, Oberon High School is a single campus years 7-12 school situated in the Geelong suburb of Armstrong Creek. It caters for students in Years 7 to 12. The current principal is Tim McMahon. 

The student population is drawn from a very wide urban, rural and coastal area. It is in close proximity to three other large secondary colleges (two state and one non-government) and shares a common boundary with a state primary school.

Curriculum 
The school offers a comprehensive program which includes a core curriculum in year 7 - 8 (English, Mathematics, Science, LOTE - German, Indonesian, Technology, Arts, Humanities, Health, and Physical Education). At years 9 to 12 a wide range of pathways are available. These include the Victorian Certificate of Education (VCE), Vocational Education Training (VET), the Victorian Certificate of Applied Learning (VCAL), and school-based apprenticeships.

Extra-curricular activities 

Students are encouraged to meet their individual interests and abilities from an extensive list of extra–curricular activities such as;
 
 Individual and team sport
 Annual drama production
 Jazz band, instrumental music and an extensive choir program
 An extensive camp program including; Central Australia, Tasmania, Indonesia, Germany and more
 Academic extension with science & engineering challenges
 Debating and public speaking festivals
 School for Student Leadership and Bogong Alpine Leadership opportunities
 Enviro team – coastal regeneration projects

Energy Breakthrough 

Oberon has previously competed in the RACV Energy Breakthrough. In 2008, "Midnight" finished 5th in the 24-Hour Hybrid Trial.

Campus

Facilities 

 an administration and library building
 three learning community buildings with adaptable spaces for a variety of learning activities
 a science arts and technology building
 a performing arts and physical education building with a competition grade double court
 four outdoor multipurpose courts and a sports oval

Sporting facilities 
The school's grounds include:

 a football oval
 netball courts
 basketball courts
 handball courts
 passive recreation areas in garden settings

Notable alumni 

 Patrick Dangerfield, AFL footballer for the Geelong Football Club, and formerly the Adelaide Football Club

 Travis Boak, AFL footballer and former captain of the Port Adelaide Football Club

References

External links 
 Oberon High School.

Schools in Geelong
Educational institutions established in 1963
Secondary schools in Victoria (Australia)
1963 establishments in Australia